Rostanga aureamala is a species of sea slug, a dorid nudibranch, a marine gastropod mollusc in the family Discodorididae.

Distribution
This species was described from Algoa Bay, South Africa, .

Description
This dorid nudibranch is bright orange to reddish-orange in colour and the dorsum is covered with caryophyllidia; in form it is very similar to other species of Rostanga. It is illustrated as Rostanga'' sp. 3 in Gosliner, 1987.

References

Discodorididae
Gastropods described in 2001